is a former Japanese football player. She played for Japan national team.

National team career
Kakinami was born on May 7, 1966. On September 6, 1981, when she was 15 years old, she debuted for Japan national team against England. She played 4 games for Japan until 1984.

National team statistics

References

1966 births
Living people
Japanese women's footballers
Japan women's international footballers
Women's association footballers not categorized by position